Migdia Skarsgård Chinea-Varela (also credited as Migdia Chinea) is an American screenwriter and director She was a writer for the TV series Superboy, as well as for The Incredible Hulk, The Facts of Life, and Punky Brewster. She appeared in the second season of Sanford and Son as Maria Fuentes, the younger sister of Julio Fuentes, in the 1973 episode "Watts Side Story". She has written about theatre for the Los Angeles Times She lives in Glendale, California.

In 2012, Skarsgård-Chinea graduated with a master's degree from the UCLA School of Theater, Film and Television. She wrote and directed the short film Anonymous (Street Meat) as part of an experimental film course. The four-minute film, which is based on her experiences with faulty mortgage foreclosure notices, was selected un certain regard to appear at the Cannes Short Film Festival and earned an honorable mention at the California International Shorts Film Festival. After the film's reception at Cannes, Chinea told The Daily Bruin that she hoped to be able to film a full-length version.

Her film The Kninth Floor was a final selection at the 2012 Philip K. Dick Science Fiction Film Festival. It was also screened at the 2012 Cyprus International Film Festival. and the 2012 Los Angeles Polish Film Festival. 

She is in production on The Prince of Old Havana, based on the life of Cuban political icon and pimp Alberto Yarini (1882–1910).

Migdia Chinea is of German-Jewish background through her mom Violeta Mimó Suarez (a variation of Soros and Schwartz).

Select film and television credits

Actress
Mannix ("Wine from These Grapes", episode 102) (1971)
Sanford and Son ("Watts Side Story", episode 32) (1973)
Splash (1984)

Director

The Prince of Old Havana (in production, for 2018 release) 
"Old Havana and the Great Pimp of San Isidro" (short film) (2014)
"Kninth Floor" (short film) (2012)
"Ard Eevin" (documentary short) (2011)
"Anonymous (Street Meat)" (short film) (2010)
Yes, Inc. (TV series) (1998)

Writer
What's Happening Now!! (5 episodes, 1985-1986)
Superboy (4 episodes, 1989-1990)

References

External links

 
 
Migdia Skarsgård-Chinea videos at Vimeo

Screenwriters from California
Television personalities from Los Angeles
American women television personalities
American entertainers of Cuban descent
Living people
Year of birth uncertain
Writers from Coral Gables, Florida
American writers of Cuban descent
American television writers
Writers from Los Angeles
UCLA Film School alumni
People from Glendale, California
Year of birth missing (living people)